Ozyornaya (Russian: Озёрная) is a station on the Kalininsko-Solntsevskaya line of the Moscow Metro, it opened on 30 August 2018 as part of line's "Ramenki" - "Rasskazovka" extension.

The city initially named the Station Ochakovo. In June 2018, the city changed the name to Ozyornaya, which comes from the nearby square and street, Ozyornaya Ploshchad and Ozyornaya Street.

References

Moscow Metro stations
Kalininsko-Solntsevskaya line
Railway stations in Russia opened in 2018
Railway stations located underground in Russia